Denaeantha is a genus of moths belonging to the family Tortricidae.

Species
Denaeantha nivigera (Diakonoff, 1941)

See also
List of Tortricidae genera

References

External links
tortricidae.com

Phricanthini
Tortricidae genera